John Vernard Dowdy (February 11, 1912 – April 12, 1995) was an American politician. Dowdy was a Democratic member of the House of Representatives from the 7th District of Texas from 1952 to 1967 and then served as a congressman from the 2nd District of Texas until 1973, when he decided to retire under indictment for bribery. During his political campaigns his commercials featured the tune "Are You From Dixie" but with the words "Are you for Dowdy, John Dowdy, We'll I'm for Dowdy, too!".

According to prosecutors, he accepted a $25,000 bribe to intervene in the federal investigation of Monarch Construction Company of Silver Spring, Maryland. In 1971, Dowdy was convicted on eight counts: two of conspiracy, one of transporting a bribe over state lines, and five of perjury. In 1973, after Dowdy retired from Congress, the United States Court of Appeals for the Fourth Circuit in Richmond, Virginia, overturned the bribery and conspiracy convictions. Dowdy still served a sentence in prison for perjury.

Dowdy was one of four U.S. Congressmen from Texas to originally sign the "Southern Manifesto," a resolution in protest of the United States Supreme Court decision in Brown v. Board of Education.

Right-wing groups rallied to his defense, including the Washington Observer and the Liberty Lobby, which contended Dowdy was the victim of a "vicious frame-up by the Justice Department in collaboration with a clique of housing racketeers". The ulterior motive, according to the newspaper, was to stop Dowdy's subcommittee investigation of the fraud at the Department of Housing and Urban Development.

Dowdy was born in Waco, Texas, and lived in Texas for most of his life. He was a lawyer before entering politics. He died in Athens, Texas.

Committee assignments
 83rd Congress — Post Office and Civil Service.
 84th Congress — Post Office and Civil Service, House Administration.
 85th through 92nd Congresses — Judiciary, District of Columbia Subcommittee.

See also
 List of federal political scandals in the United States
 List of American federal politicians convicted of crimes

References

|-

1912 births
1995 deaths
20th-century American politicians
American perjurers
Democratic Party members of the United States House of Representatives from Texas
East Texas Baptist University alumni
People from Athens, Texas
People from Dupont Circle
People from Waco, Texas
Texas politicians convicted of crimes